Ji Yoon-ho (born Yoon Byung-ho; March 16, 1991) is a South Korean actor.

Filmography

Television series

Films

References

External links
 

1991 births
Living people
21st-century South Korean male actors
South Korean male television actors
South Korean male film actors